Jakob Šubelj (born 1922, date of death unknown) was a Slovenian gymnast. He competed in eight events at the 1948 Summer Olympics.

References

1922 births
Year of death missing
Slovenian male artistic gymnasts
Olympic gymnasts of Yugoslavia
Gymnasts at the 1948 Summer Olympics
Sportspeople from Ljubljana